Salaar is an upcoming Indian Telugu-language action thriller film written and directed by Prashanth Neel, and produced by Vijay Kiragandur under Hombale Films. It stars Prabhas in a dual role and as the titular charecter, along with Prithviraj Sukumaran, Shruti Haasan, and Jagapathi Babu. 

The film was announced in December 2020 with principal photography beginning in January 2021 near Godavarikhani, Telangana. The music is composed by Ravi Basrur, while the cinematography is done by Bhuvan Gowda.

Salaar was originally scheduled for a theatrical release on 14 April 2022 but was delayed due to production delays owing to the COVID-19 pandemic. The film is scheduled to be theatrically released on 28 September 2023.

Cast 

 Prabhas as Salaar
 Prithviraj Sukumaran as Vardharaja Mannaar
 Shruti Haasan as Aadhya
 Jagapathi Babu as Raja Mannaar
 Madhu Guruswamy
Easwari Rao 
Sriya Reddy

Production

Development 
The film along with its title was announced on 2 December 2020. Touted to be an action thriller, the film marks the first collaboration between director Prashanth Neel and Prabhas, and the first Telugu venture of Neel. On his role, Prabhas stated: "my character is extremely violent, so this is something I haven’t really done before." A few reports claimed that the film is the remake of Neel's debut film Ugramm, however, Neel clarified that Salaar is not a remake but an original story written for Prabhas. 

The film was formally launched in Hyderabad on 16 January 2021. Ravi Basrur is composing the music while Bhuvan Gowda is the cinematographer.

Casting 
Actress Shruti Haasan was cast in a leading role in January 2021. Kannada actor Madhu Guruswamy is set to play a pivotal role. In March, actress Easwari Rao was signed to play Salaar's mother. Later in August, Jagapathi Babu joined the cast, whose character was revealed as Rajamanaar.

In October 2021, actor Prithviraj Sukumaran entered the talks to play a crucial role in the film. In March 2022, Prabhas said that Prithviraj is part of Salaar during a promotional event of his film Radhe Shyam. Later in June, Prithviraj stated that he gave a nod to the script but was trying to adjust the dates to work in the film. Later in October 2022, Prithiviraj's role was confirmed and the film marks his return to Telugu cinema after 12 years, following his appearance in Police Police (2010). Sriya Reddy is also cast in a key role.

Filming 
The film's shoot began on 29 January 2021 in the coal mines near the city of Godavarikhani, Telangana. First schedule was completed by February 2021. Second schedule of the film began in August 2021 in Hyderabad.

About 30% of the shoot was completed by March 2022. Filming was halted due to the release of Prabhas' Radhe Shyam (2022) and Neel's K.G.F: Chapter 2 (2022) and was planned to be resumed in May. However, Prabhas underwent a knee surgery in March during his vacation in Spain, which further delayed the shoot. In June 2022, a new schedule began at Hyderabad's Ramoji Film City with Prabhas and Haasan joining the sets. The team also shot a 20-minute long action sequence in the middle of the sea, spending about 10 crore on the scene.

Salaar reportedly employed Dark Centric Theme (DCT) technology to shoot the film, making it the first Indian film to do so. As a result the film's lighting pattern and color palette would be darker in color.

Release
Salaar is scheduled for a theatrical release on 28 September 2023 in Telugu and dubbed versions of Kannada, Hindi, Tamil and Malayalam languages. The film is distributed by UV Creations in Andhra Pradesh and Telangana while KRG Studios in Karnataka state. 

Earlier in August 2021, it was announced that the film was going to release on 14 April 2022. The film was later postponed due to Neel and Hombale's film, K.G.F: Chapter 2 which was scheduled to release on that date. In March 2022, producer Vijay Kiragandur in an interview with Pinkvilla stated that the film was postponed to the second quarter (April–June) of 2023 due to production delays owing to the COVID-19 pandemic. In August 2022, the release date was announced as 28 September 2023.

References

External links
 

2023 films
Upcoming Indian films
Upcoming Telugu-language films
Indian action thriller films
Upcoming films
Films shot in Telangana
Films shot in Hyderabad, India
Films directed by Prashanth Neel
2020s Telugu-language films